Trifluoronitrosomethane (commonly abbreviated TFNM) is a toxic organic compound consisting of a trifluoromethyl group covalently bound to a nitroso group. Its distinctive deep blue color is unusual for a gas.

History 
Trifluoronitrosomethane was synthesized for the first time in 1936 by Otto Ruff and Manfred Giese at the University of Wrocław. It was created through the fluorination of silver cyanide in the presence of silver nitrate and silver oxide.

Production 
Trifluoronitrosomethane can be produced from the reaction of trifluoroiodomethane and nitric oxide under a UV light with a yield of up to 90% in normal pressure. A small amount of mercury is needed as catalyst. The reaction results in the creation of iodine as a by-product.

Properties

Although it is somewhat more kinetically stable due to its fluorine substituents, trifluoronitrosomethane, like other nitroso compounds, has a weak C–N bond of only 39.9 kcal/mol.

Related
Trifluoronitrosoethylene is also a similar deep blue gas.

See also
Trichloronitrosomethane

References

External links

Trifluoromethyl compounds
Nitroso compounds
Gases with color
Substances discovered in the 1930s